The bismuthide ion is Bi3−.

Bismuthides are compounds of bismuth with more electropositive elements. They are intermetallic compounds, containing partially metallic and partially ionic bonds.  The majority of bismuthides adopt efficient packing arrangements and become densely packed structures, which is a characteristic of intermetallic compounds.

See also
Bismanol

References

Anions
Bismuth
Bismuthides